The Tagbanwa are an ethnic group of Palawan, Philippines.

Tagbanwa may also refer to:

Aborlan Tagbanwa language
Calamian Tagbanwa language
Central Tagbanwa language
Tagbanwa alphabet
Tagbanwa (Unicode block)

See also
 Tagabawa language, a Manobo language of Davao City and Mount Apo in Mindanao, the Philippines

Language and nationality disambiguation pages